Chris Price (born Kristian Price Pérez; August 26, 1984) is an American musician, singer and record producer. He has released three albums to date as a solo artist, including Homesick in 2012, Stop Talking in 2017, and Dalmatian, which was released on March 2, 2018. He is also known as the producer of the 2014 album The Soul of All Natural Things by Linda Perhacs and as the producer of the 2016 album Rainbow Ends by Emitt Rhodes. Price is also a member of the bands Taylor Locke and The Roughs and Bebopalula.

Early life
Price was born Kristian Price Pérez in Miami, Florida, the son of Betsy Pérez (née Betson, b. 1963, Lansdowne, Pennsylvania) and Grammy Award winning record producer and songwriter Rudy Pérez (b. 1958, Pinar Del Rio, Cuba). He has three younger brothers, Michael, Corey and Adam, and a half sister named Jennifer. Price attended Miami Beach Senior High School in Miami Beach, Florida, where he came under the tutelage of music instructor Doug Burris. Price participated in Burris' Miami Beach Rock Ensemble in high school, where he formed musical partnerships with other students Roger Houdaille and Fernando Perdomo. The three started a band called Dreaming in Stereo and released one EP locally in 2005 before disbanding. Price and Houdaille went on to form the popular local band Monkeypox, which released 3 albums, several non-album singles and a feature-length film in 2005 before breaking up. Price then began writing and performing songs with his brothers Michael and Corey under the band name Price.

Career

Price (2006–2009)
In 2006, the band Price, which consisted of brothers Chris, Michael & Corey and drummer Alex Ibanez, was signed to Geffen Records and the three brothers relocated to Los Angeles. Price wrote and recorded two songs for feature films. The song "Hey Nancy Drew" was featured on the soundtrack of the 2007 film Nancy Drew, and the song "Something in Your Eyes" was featured in the film Blonde Ambition. The band showcased at the 2007 South by Southwest Music Conference to an enthusiastic response. In 2008, following the departure of Ibanez and the introduction of new drummer Charles Streeter, Price went into the studio with producer Tony Berg and recorded a full-length album. The album was ultimately not released and Price parted ways with Geffen Records in 2009 before going on an extended hiatus.

Taylor Locke and The Roughs (2010–2012)
In 2009, Price began collaborating on songs with Rooney guitarist Taylor Locke. Their songwriting sessions led to the formation of a band called Taylor Locke & The Roughs. Price and Locke co-wrote and co-produced two albums under the Roughs moniker in 2010. The album Grain & Grape was featured on several Best Albums of 2010 lists, including an Album of the Year mention by the power pop blog Powerpopaholic. After the release of their second album, Marathon, the band did extensive touring in 2011, opening for the Canadian rock band Sloan on the East coast and in Canada, as well as a headlining tour on the West coast. In 2012, they released a live album, Live at Rosalita's, and completed work on a third album called Parallel Lines that has yet to be released.

Homesick (2012)
Price began work on a solo album in 2011. Upon purchasing his first IPhone, Price was struck by the sonic quality of the phone's mic and decided to attempt to record an entire album using nothing but the mic of the phone and an app called 4Tracks which simulates the recording process of an analog 4-track Tape machine. The resulting album, Homesick, was released in 2012. Lead single "That's Your Boyfriend" was chosen as iTunes Single of the Week in May 2012 and the album received a 4-star review from the New York Daily News.

Linda Perhacs - The Soul Of All Natural Things (2013–2014)
Price and his former Dreaming In Stereo bandmate Fernando Perdomo worked together to co-produce an album for Linda Perhacs entitled The Soul of All Natural Things. It is Perhacs' first album in 44 years. The album was released on March 4, 2014 by Asthmatic Kitty. AllMusic gave the album 4 out of 5 stars, and Thom Jurek's review states: "The Soul of All Natural Things does stand on its own in terms of quality, but is unmistakably an extension of the sonic, spiritual continuum Perhacs' began – and probably thought she left – on Parallelograms. Her uncommon, even singular approach to singing, recording, and writing, remains fully in evidence here." In The New York Times' favorable review, Jon Pareles says of Price and Perdomo's production: "They keep the music sounding largely organic without making the album a slavish period piece."

Emitt Rhodes (2013–2016)
Powerpop artist Emitt Rhodes began collaborating with Price on a new album in 2013, which would be his first album since 1973's "Farewell To Paradise". The forthcoming album features contributions from Jellyfish members Roger Joseph Manning, Jr. and Jason Falkner, along with Taylor Locke, Joseph Seiders and Fernando Perdomo. It is set for release on February 26, 2016. In the July 2015 issue of MOJO Magazine, Rhodes is quoted as saying: "It was remarkable. It had all the energy that I had lost about 20 years ago. It's brilliant fucking shit, and Chris is a fucking genius." On Record Store Day 2015, Price and Rhodes released a vinyl single together to promote an upcoming Bee Gees tribute album. The A-side, produced by Price, is Rhodes' cover of "How Can You Mend A Broken Heart", and the B-side is Price's version of "Please Read Me". On November 21, 2015, The Wall Street Journal's blog Speakeasy premiered the first single from Emitt Rhodes' new album Rainbow Ends, produced by Price. The song, "Dog On A Chain", features vocal harmonies by Aimee Mann and a guitar solo by Jon Brion. The album will be released by Omnivore Recordings.

Stop Talking (2017)
On March 24, 2017 it was announced that Price's 5-years-in-the-making follow up to Homesick, entitled Stop Talking, would be released by Omnivore Recordings on May 19. The album features 14 tracks and was entirely produced, engineered & mixed by Price himself. A trailer was also released that previews a handful of songs and indicates the album will be released in limited quantities on vinyl exclusively at independent record stores. In advance of the release date, 3 songs premiered, entitled "Stop Talking", "Hi Lo"  & "Man Down".

Linda Perhacs - I'm A Harmony (2017)
On September 22, 2017, Linda released her 3rd album I'm A Harmony on the Omnivore Recordings label. The album was produced by Pat Sansone of Wilco alongside Linda and Fernando Perdomo. Chris wrote 4 songs on the album, including the title track which developed out of an informal jam between Chris and Julia Holter.

Jeffrey Gaines (2018)
It was announced on November 20, 2017 that Chris Price has produced a new album for Jeffrey Gaines entitled Alright. The album, which is being released on January 26, 2018, has 10 songs all produced, engineered and mixed by Price and features the band Jackshit (Val McCallum, Davey Faragher and Pete Thomas) on all songs. The album was recorded live in the studio in three days.

Dalmatian (2018)
On March 2, 2018, Omnivore Recordings released the third studio album by Chris Price, Dalmatian. The album features 13 tracks written, produced, engineered and mixed by Price himself and includes songs that were compiled during the same sessions as the previous Price album Stop Talking.

Roger Joseph Manning Jr - Glamping (2018)
Former Jellyfish member Roger Joseph Manning, Jr. released his first new solo material since 2008's Catnip Dynamite on May 18, 2018. The EP, entitled "Glamping", featured 4 new songs, 3 of which ("Operator", "Is It All A Dream?" and "I'm Not Your Cowboy" feature Chris Price as a co-writer. More music from these sessions is expected to be released, according to interviews with Manning.

Alex Jules - Topiary (2019)
The debut album by Alex Jules, "Topiary", was released on March 8, 2019. Produced, engineered and mixed by Chris Price, the album marks the first time all Bebopalula band members (Price & Jules along with Emeen Zarookian and Ben Lecourt) worked in a studio together on an album. "Topiary" also features Fernando Perdomo, Kyle Fredrickson, Kaitlin Wolfberg, Corey Perez and Matt Fish as guest musicians.

Val McCallum - Chateauguay (2019)
On March 15, 2019, guitarist Val McCallum self released a new album produced & mixed by Price entitled "Chateauguay". McCallum's second solo album features Price, Davey Faragher, Joe Seiders, Shelby Lynne, Z Berg and Pete Thomas.

Upcoming Projects
A full length album by Bebopalula is expected to be released in 2019.

Discography

as Chris Price

Homesick (2012)

"How Can You Mend A Broken Heart"/"Please Read Me" single (with Emitt Rhodes) (2015)

Stop Talking (2017)

Dalmatian (2018)

"I Won't Last A Day Without You" single from White Lace And Promises: The Songs Of Paul Williams (2018)

as part of Price

"Hey Nancy Drew" from the film Nancy Drew (2007)

"Something in Your Eyes" from the film Blonde Ambition (2008)

"I Don't Want A Thing This Christmas" single (2009)

Unreleased album produced by Tony Berg (2009)

as part of Taylor Locke and The Roughs

Grain & Grape (2010) (wrote and produced all songs with Taylor Locke)

Marathon (2010) (wrote and produced all songs with Taylor Locke)

Live At Rosalita's (2012)

Parallel Lines (not yet released)

as part of Monkeypox

Ahhh! Monkeypox (2005)

Hey! That's MY Wife! Get Your Own! (2005)

We Are Monkeypox (2005)

In Limbo – Original Soundtrack (2005)

“For Lovers Only/Surfin' Surfside" single (2005)

“No Hellos/Painted Chariot" single (2005)

Maurier Debbouze – Rock And Roll The Album (2006)

as producer

Chloe Lear – Girl Interrupted (2011)

Victoria Sole – Al Otro Lado De Mi Atmosfera (2013)

Jacquelyn – The Kiss (2013)

Linda Perhacs – The Soul of All Natural Things (2014) (co-wrote "The Soul Of All Natural Things", "Children", "River Of God", "Freely", "Immunity" and "When Things Are True Again")

Shay Astar – Land of Wandering (2014)

Tyler Peterson – Power of a Country Song (2015)

Ana Cristina - The West Coast Sessions (2015)

Jacquelyn - And So It Goes (2016)

Emitt Rhodes – Rainbow Ends (2016) (co-wrote "Someone Else")

Bebopalula - EP (2016)

Jeffrey Gaines - Alright (2018)

Alex Jules - Topiary (2019)

Val McCallum - Chateauguay (2019)

Gerry Cea - Something New (2019)

appearing as musician

Linda Perhacs - I'm A Harmony (co-writer of "I'm A Harmony", "Winds Of The Sky", "We Will Live" and "Eclipse Of All Love")

Taylor Locke – Time Stands Still (co-writer of "No Dice", "Call Me Kuchu" and "So Long")

Roger Joseph Manning, Jr. – Glamping (co-writer of "Operator", "Is It All A Dream" and "I'm Not Your Cowboy")

Bleu – Four

Low – C'mon

Christina Aguilera – Pero Me Acuerdo de Ti

Ex Norwegian - Pure Gold

Luis Fonsi – Imaginame Sin Ti

Jencarlos – Nadie Como Yo

Los Temerarios - Mi Vida Sin Ti

Jim Camacho – Beachfront Defeat

Jim Camacho – Fools Paradise (songbook)

Father Bloopy – Ginger, Baby

The BJ Experience – If You Call Me I'm Ready To Party

Jerrod's Door – 2003 album

Sabrina Barnett – Set Me Free

Jacobs Ladder – EP

Dreaming in Stereo – EP

External links
 Official website
 Chris Price on All Music
 Chris Price on Discogs
 Chris Price's verified Facebook page
 Chris Price on YouTube
 Chris Price on Bandcamp

References

1984 births
Living people
American male guitarists
American male pianists
American rock guitarists
American rock pianists
Guitarists from Florida
Musicians from Miami
Record producers from Florida
21st-century American guitarists
21st-century American male musicians
21st-century American pianists